Carzone is an Irish website and technology platform for motor dealers and consumers located in Dublin, Ireland, and is owned by Mediahuis. 

It began as part of Webzone Ltd, a web design and production company. Carzone is available across multiple devices with a dedicated iPhone App, Android App, Desktop Website and Mobile Site. In 2004 Carzone was sold to the Guardian Media Group (GMG). Trader Media Group (TMG) a subsidiary of GMG, acquired Webzone Ltd, the Dublin holding company of the motor website.  Trader Media Group is the predecessor of Auto Trader Group. 

In October 2022, Mediahuis Ireland, the publisher formerly known as Independent News & Media (INM), acquired Carzone from Auto Trader Group for €30 million. Mediahuis is a newspaper and magazine publishing, distribution, printing, TV, radio and online media company founded in 2014 with operations in Belgium, the Netherlands, Ireland, Luxembourg and Germany.

References

 Carzone.ie now more popular than Facebook. The Sunday Business Post, July 06, 2008. 
 Guardian Media Group drives €5m takeover of Carzone motor website. The Sunday Business Post, September 18, 2005. 
 Determination of the Competition Authority.  Competition Authority (Ireland), November 3, 2005. 
 Mediahuis acquires Irish motoring website Carzone for €30m.  Irish Times, October 24, 2022. 
 Mediahuis buys car marketplace Carzone for €30m.  RTE, October 24, 2022. 
 Mediahuis buys Carzone in €30m deal: Acquisition creates Ireland’s largest motoring marketplace.  Irish Independent, October 24, 2022. 

Automotive websites